is a massively multiplayer online role-playing game, developed by Dwango and published by Square Enix (formerly Enix). It has been released in Japan, Taiwan, and Chinese Mainland since 2001.

On June 27, 2007, Square Enix announced that service of Cross Gate in Japan will be terminated on September 30, 2007. This will not affect the servers in Chinese Mainland, Taiwan and Korea.

The sequel to the game, Concerto Gate, has finished its testing phase in Japan.

Gameplay
Cross Gate uses a traditional Japanese cartoon style and 2D graphics system with player characters pre-rendered in 3D. The battle style is turn-based, resembling the Dragon Quest series, and players may choose to team up to a maximum of five players. There are 56 possible character choices, including 14 unique characters with four color variations. The game includes over 60 jobs and 80 unique skills.

One of the distinctive features of this game is its "Creature System." Slightly similar to the Pokémon series, this game allows players to carry five creatures with them while traveling and place one creature fighting with them while battling. There is a character class specialized in catching those creatures and trading them in an open marketplace where players bid for the strongest, rarest, or cutest creatures. By assigning ability points to five different dimensions when the creature levels up, players may grow their unique creatures. There are around 200 creatures to collect.

Expansions
There has been three official expansion packs released for this game, involving two additional developers in this MMORPG.
Cross Gate: Power-Up Kit Tatsu no Sunadokei, released December 13, 2002
Cross Gate: Power-Up Kit 2 Rakuen no Tamago, released December 18, 2003
Cross Gate: Power-Up Kit 3 Tenkai no Kishi to Hoshiei no Utahime, released December 22, 2004

References

External links
  (Archived on March 21, 2005) 
  
  

2001 video games
Massively multiplayer online role-playing games
Square Enix games
Video games with isometric graphics
Dwango (company)
Japan-exclusive video games
Video games scored by Kenji Ito
Video games developed in Japan
Windows games
Windows-only games